Papworth Wood is an  biological Site of Special Scientific Interest in Papworth Everard in Cambridgeshire.

This is one of the oldest secondary woods in the county. It has diverse ground flora including brambles, rough meadow grass, stinging nettles, ground ivy, bluebells and primroses.

There is access to the wood from the grounds of Papworth Hospital.

References

Sites of Special Scientific Interest in Cambridgeshire